The Odd Fellows Block, located at 23-25 S 4th st and 324 Kittson Ave in the Downtown Grand Forks Historic District of Grand Forks, North Dakota is a historic building built in 1888 as a home for the Odd Fellows meeting hall, which was situated on the third floor.  The hall was fitted with a large and well-appointed lodge room, a banquet hall, and numerous smaller rooms.

History
The Odd Fellows Block is architecturally significant in that it is one of two remaining Richardsonian Romanesque buildings extant in Grand Forks along with the St John's Block.  These buildings were, along with the now demolished Security Building, the most impressive in Grand Forks in the late 19th century. The south (principal) and west elevations of the building feature cream brick towers framing recessed red brick bays along with stone details and decorative brick panels.  Visible above the roof is a large wire frame skylight, now covered over with tar paper, which once lit the meeting hall below.  The second floor apartments date to the original construction.

The Odd Fellows Block played a significant role in the social and civic life of Grand Forks in the last decades of the 19th century serving as a meeting place for three Odd Fellows' lodges and the Daughters of Rebekah, as well as for lodges of the Ancient Order of United Workmen, the Knights of the Maccabees, the Order of Foresters, the Grand Army of the Republic, and the Royal Arcanum.

The Odd Fellows block serves as the southwestern anchor of the historic district in downtown Grand Forks.

References

Cultural infrastructure completed in 1888
Odd Fellows buildings in North Dakota
Richardsonian Romanesque architecture in North Dakota
Clubhouses on the National Register of Historic Places in North Dakota
National Register of Historic Places in Grand Forks, North Dakota
1888 establishments in Dakota Territory